The Synod of Constantinople in 1484 was a local synod of the Eastern Orthodox Church. It was the first synod to condemn the Council of Florence.

History
After the 1453 fall of Constantinople, the Ottoman government organized the Patriarchate of Constantinople as a department within the Islamic state and supported its Orthodox heritage and anti-Catholic feelings with the political objective of moving the captured Greeks away from Western Europe. The Patriarch of Constantinople at the time, Symeon I, served the interests of the Ottoman Sultan, both during his second reign with his policy towards Trebizond and, during his last reign, by convening a synod to formally ratify the separation of the Catholic Church.

The Synod of Constantinople was convened by Patriarch Symeon I and lasted from September 1483 until August 1484. It was held in the patriarchal Pammakaristos Church, in the presence of representatives of the Patriarchs of Alexandria, Antioch and Jerusalem (the latter sees then being under the Mamluk Sultanate of Cairo). The main issue of the synod was the need to define a ritual for the admission to the Eastern Orthodox Church of the converted from the Catholic Church. This issue was quite relevant in such years due to the conquests by the Ottomans of areas previously subjected to Western rule (e.g. the Duchy of Athens) and to the Ottoman system of government of the minorities (the millet system) which subjected the Catholics to the civil authority of the Patriarch of Constantinople, causing numerous conversions to Orthodoxy.

The Synod, as preliminary remark, stated that the Council of Florence had been not canonically summoned or composed, and so its decrees were null and void, and then approved a ritual for the reception for the converts which required the Chrismation and an abjuration of the Council of Florence (but not a re-baptism). 

The 1484 Synod of Constantinople was the first synod to condemn the Council of Florence, as the so-called 1450 Synod of Saint Sophia never took place and its documents are a forgery of the early 17th century. However the decrees of the 1484 synod were not universally implemented and cases of inter-communion between Catholics and Orthodox went on in the regions subjected to the Venetian Republic until the 18th century.

Notes

Constantinople 1484
1484
East–West Schism
1484 in Europe
15th-century Eastern Orthodoxy